The Tahquitz Community is one of a few local Boy Scout honor societies in the United States that have not been absorbed by the Order of the Arrow.  The organization was created in 1925 and consisted of 15 honor Scouts who were chosen to start and maintain a perpetual volunteer summer camp staff at Camp Tahquitz.

To keep active during the winter months, the organization has developed an extensive Indian Lore, backpacking and service program. These programs benefit the Long Beach Area Council and surrounding community and give the members unique youth leadership experience.

The organization is particularly known for the Indian lore ceremonies that its members perform throughout the year at Scouting and civic group meetings. A great sense of dedication and many traditions has been developed throughout the 80-plus year history of the organization. 
Tahquitz Community exists only in the Long Beach Area Council, but has many "out of council" members, from California to New York, and beyond.

Officers 
The Tahquitz Community is run by five elected officers with each serving a one year term.

Archon: The Archon is the chief executive officer, and is responsible for overseeing and coordinating all the Community's activities. They are the organization's spokesperson and main connection to the Scout units in the Long Beach Area Council and the community. In addition, the Archon is also responsible for working closely with the camp director to ensure a successful summer camp season.

Minor Archon: The Minor Archon assists the Archon, and assumes the responsibilities of the Archon in their absence. They are the editor-in-chief of The Runner and also oversee the Community's Neophyte program. The Runner is the organization's newsletter, which is published regularly and is filled with articles by the members, news about upcoming events, and other features of interests.

Envoy: The Envoy is primarily responsible for the Indian lore program of the Community. For many decades, the organization has studied a variety Native American tribes. They also coordinate the Community's powwows, workshops and induction.

Mountaineer: The Community also promotes camping and outdoor activities. The Mountaineer's duties include promoting Camp Tahquitz to Scouts whose troops have signed up to go to summer camp. They also assist the Archon and the council with camporees, backpacking trips, rock climbing, the Venturing program and other activities.

Keeper: The Keeper is the financial officer of the Community and works with the business manager to maintain the Community's accounts, records, and supplies. They also assist the other officers in the preparation of an annual budget and is responsible for all saleable supplies.

Membership requirements 
To be eligible for membership, a Scout must:
be at least 14 years of age or have completed the 8th grade by December 31 of the year in which they apply;
be a registered member of a Boy Scout troop and hold the rank of First Class or above;
have earned two of the following merit badges: Backpacking, Camping, Cooking, Hiking, Wilderness Survival;
have 20 days of camping experience, including Camp Tahquitz.

Membership invitation
Near the end of the week of summer camp that a troop attends, the youth camp staff, along with scoutmasters present in camp, meets at Tribe Rock. There they discuss all of the Scouts present in camp who are truly “Honor Scouts.” Then, after a democratic vote by any and all youth members present (mostly that year's current youth camp staff), those Scouts who are deemed worthy are offered an invitation to join. The Community announces and invites its new members at the Friday night awards campfire.

In order to become regular members, they must complete the annual induction ceremony held at Camp Tahquitz over Labor Day weekend.  All regular members have the right to hold office and vote on Community business.  At the annual meeting following their 21st birthday, youth Members become "Honorary" members.  They provide valuable service to the Community as advisers, but can no longer vote or hold office.

The Long Beach Area Council did not have an Order of the Arrow lodge for many years, but used only the camping honor society, the Tahquitz Community. The Tahquitz Community will continue and has not ended, but on May 19, 2012 the Long Beach Area Council started an Order of the Arrow lodge. A number of councils have both OA and local camping honor societies.

See also
Order of the Arrow
Tribe of Mic-O-Say
Firecrafter
Wolfeboro Pioneers
Tahquitz (spirit)

External links
http://www.camptahquitz.com
http://www.tribeoftahquitz.org

References

Associations related to the Boy Scouts of America
Honor societies
Organizations based in Long Beach, California
Organizations established in 1925